Brianne is a given name variant of Brianna. Notable people with the name include:

 Brianne Berkson (born 1985), American actress
 Brianne Davis (born 1982), American actress
 Brianne Desa (born 2000), Canadian-Guyanese footballer
 Brianne Howey (born 1989), American actress
 Brianne Jenner (born 1991), Canadian ice hockey player
 Brianne Leary (born 1957), American actress
 Brianne McLaughlin (born 1987), American ice hockey player
 Brianne Moncrief (born 1983), American actress
 Brianne Murphy (1933-2003), British cinematographer
 Brianne Nadeau (born 1980), Democratic politician
 Brianne Nelson (born 1980), American long-distance runner
 Brianne Pfannenstiel (born 1988), American journalist
 Brianne Reed (born 1994), American soccer player
 Brianne Siddall (born 1963), American voice actress
 Brianne Theisen-Eaton (born 1988), Canadian track and field athlete
 Brianne Tju (born 1998), American actress
 Brianne Tutt (born 1992), Canadian speed skater
 Brianne West, New Zealand entrepreneur